Conceive Magazine was a health and lifestyle publication that provided information about women's health and fertility, about various methods of conception (natural, alternative, assisted and high-tech), and about adoption. The magazine had its headquarters in Orlando, Florida. It was in circulation between 2004 and 2013.

History and profile
Conceive was founded by Kim Hahn and offers information and support to women interested in starting or expanding their families. The content also includes articles on nutrition, exercise, emotional wellbeing, sex, and relationship issues. The magazine also covers early (first trimester) pregnancy.

In addition to the magazine, the Conceive brand included a website (www.conceiveonline.com), e-newsletters, and three books (The Fertility Journal, Fertility Facts, and Cooking to Conceive, all published by Chronicle Books).

In October 2009 Conceive was acquired by the Bonnier Corporation, the U.S. branch of a large Swedish media company, with over 50 titles in the United States. Conceive joined Bonnier's Parenting Group, which included the magazines Parenting, Babytalk, and Working Mother. In May 2013 the magazine was sold to Meredith Corp., and following the change in ownership it ceased publication.

References

External links
 conceive online
 conceive on-air
 

2004 establishments in Florida
2013 disestablishments in Florida
Bimonthly magazines published in the United States
Lifestyle magazines published in the United States
Quarterly magazines published in the United States
Bonnier Group
Defunct Meredith Corporation magazines
Defunct women's magazines published in the United States
Health magazines
Magazines established in 2004
Magazines disestablished in 2013
Magazines published in Florida
Mass media in Orlando, Florida